This is a list of members of the Tasmanian House of Assembly between the 1866 elections and the 1871 elections.

Notes 

  In December 1866, William Crowther, one of the five members for Hobart Town, resigned. Josiah Pratt won the resulting by-election on 2 January 1867.
  In July 1867, Robert Byron Miller, one of the five members for Hobart Town, resigned. Charles Cansdell won the resulting by-election on 19 August 1867.
  In January 1869, William Archer, the member for Deloraine, resigned. Henry Douglas was elected unopposed on 12 February 1869.
  In February 1869, George Salier, one of the five members for Hobart Town, resigned. William Giblin won the resulting by-election on 24 March 1869.
  In May 1869, Charles Cansdell, one of the five members for Hobart Town, resigned. Henry Cook won the resulting by-election on 22 June 1869.
  In June 1869, John Gleadow, the member for Morven, resigned. John Whitehead was elected unopposed on 1 July 1869.
  In June 1869, George Gibson, the member for Ringwood, resigned. Robert Archer won the resulting by-election on 6 July 1869.
  In June 1869, William Barnes, the member for George Town, resigned. James Scott was elected unopposed on 15 July 1869.
  In February 1870, William Lambert Dobson, the member for Campbell Town, resigned. George Keach won the resulting by-election on 10 March 1870.
  In July 1870, William Dodery, the member for Norfolk Plains, resigned. Charles Rocher won the resulting by-election on 8 August 1870.
  In October 1870, Josiah Pratt, one of the five members for Hobart Town, resigned. George Salier won the resulting by-election on 28 November 1870.
  On 26 January 1871, Hugh Barrett, one of the five members for Hobart Town, died. Russell Young won the resulting by-election on 27 February 1871.
  In March 1871, John Meredith, the member for Glamorgan, resigned. Edward Shaw won the resulting by-election on 11 April 1871.

Ministerial by-elections

  On 24 November 1866, William Lambert Dobson was appointed to the Ministry by the new Premier of Tasmania, Richard Dry, and was therefore required to resign and contest a ministerial by-election, at which he was returned unopposed on 4 December 1866. Not so fortunate was Colonial Treasurer Thomas Chapman, one of the five members for Hobart Town, who was defeated by John Lord on 3 December 1866. John Crookes resigned his Launceston seat, which Chapman won at the resulting by-election on 31 December 1866.
  On 27 October 1869, James Milne Wilson appointed Henry Butler to the Ministry. He was returned unopposed at the resulting ministerial by-election on 8 November 1869.
  On 5 February 1870, James Milne Wilson appointed William Giblin to the Ministry. He was returned unopposed at the resulting ministerial by-election on 14 February 1870.

Sources
 
 Parliament of Tasmania (2020). The Parliament of Tasmania from 1856

Members of Tasmanian parliaments by term
19th-century Australian politicians